West Adelaide may refer to:
A geographical region to the west of the Adelaide city centre in South Australia
West Adelaide SC, Reformed football club 1978 NSL Champions (also known as West Adelaide Hellas and Adelaide Sharks)
West Adelaide Football Club an Australian rules football club
West Adelaide Bearcats a basketball team
the Electoral district of West Adelaide

See also
Western Adelaide, a region in South Australia